The 2010 Città di Caltanissetta was a professional tennis tournament played on outdoor red clay courts. It was part of the 2010 ATP Challenger Tour. It took place in Caltanissetta, Italy between 15 and 21 March 2010.

ATP entrants

Seeds

Rankings are as of March 8, 2010.

Other entrants
The following players received wildcards into the singles main draw:
  Francesco Aldi
  Alessio di Mauro
  Paolo Lorenzi
  Matteo Trevisan

The following players received entry from the qualifying draw:
  Martín Alund
  Daniele Giorgini
  Leonardo Kirche
  Franko Škugor

The following player received special exempt into the main draw:
  Yūichi Sugita

Champions

Singles

 Robin Haase def.  Matteo Trevisan, 7–5, 6–3

Doubles

 David Marrero /  Santiago Ventura def.  Uladzimir Ignatik /  Martin Kližan, 7–6(3), 6–4

External links
 Official website

Città di Caltanissetta
Città di Caltanissetta